The 2010–11 season of the Oberliga Hamburg, the highest association football league in the German state of Hamburg, was the third season of the league at tier five (V) of the German football league system.

League table 
The 2010–11 season saw four new clubs in the league, SV Rugenbergen, Germania Schnelsen and Bramfelder SV, all promoted from the Landesligas while FC St. Pauli II had been relegated from the Regionalliga Nord to the league.

Results

References

External links 
 German Football Association (DFB) 
 Kicker magazine 
 2010–11 Oberliga Hamburg season at Weltfussball.de 

Hamburg
Oberliga Hamburg
2010s in Hamburg